Philautus larutensis is a species of frog in the family Rhacophoridae.
It is endemic to Indonesia.

Its natural habitat is subtropical or tropical moist montane forests.
It is threatened by habitat loss.

References

Amphibians of Indonesia
larutensis
Amphibians described in 1923
Taxonomy articles created by Polbot
Taxobox binomials not recognized by IUCN